North Grenville was an electoral district of the Legislative Assembly in the Australian state of Victoria from 1856 to 1859. 
It was bordered on the east by the Yarrowee River and included an area south of Ballarat.
The short-lived, rural district of North Grenville was one of the initial districts of the first Victorian Legislative Assembly, 1856.

Members for North Grenville

After North Grenville was abolished, Lalor went on to represent the Electoral district of South Grant from October 1859.

References

Former electoral districts of Victoria (Australia)
1856 establishments in Australia
1859 disestablishments in Australia